This is a list of heads of government of Liechtenstein.

The current  is Daniel Risch, since 25 March 2021.

Head of government

Provincial administrator (1861–1921)
The  was the title of the head of government from 1861 to 1921.

Prime Minister (1921–present)
The  is the current title for the head of government.

Deputy head of government

See also
Politics of Liechtenstein
Prince of Liechtenstein
Lists of incumbents

References

External links
World Statesmen – Liechtenstein

1921 establishments in Liechtenstein
Politics of Liechtenstein
Liechtenstein, Head of Government

Lists of Liechtenstein people